Daniel David Federman, (1928 – September 6, 2017) was an American endocrinologist and the Carl W. Walter Distinguished Professor of Medicine and the Dean for Medical Education at Harvard Medical School. He helped change medical education at through its New Pathway curriculum around the early 1990s, and his work helped create the field of genetic endocrinology.  Federman also worked for over thirty years at Boston's Brigham and Women's Hospital, a Harvard teaching hospital in the Longwood Medical and Academic Area.

Before he was dean for medical education, he served as dean for students and alumni. He later became Senior Dean for Alumni Relations and Clinical Teaching. He was also an endocrinologist specializing in diabetes and hormones and practicing clinical medicine in Brookline, Massachusetts.

After he retired in Spring 2007, he served in Miami for over six years at the University of Miami's Miller School of Medicine.

Education 
 1949, Harvard College (summa cum laude, Social Relations), Boston, Massachusetts
 1953, Harvard Medical School (magna cum laude), Boston, Massachusetts
 Massachusetts General Hospital (MGH), Boston, Massachusetts, internship and residency

Professional career 
Dr. Federman was born in New York City in 1928, the son of European immigrants who settled in the Bronx. He graduated summa cum laude from Harvard College in 1949 and magna cum laude from Harvard Medical School in 1953. 

Following an internship and residency at Massachusetts General Hospital (MGH), he became a clinical associate at the National Institute of Arthritis and Metabolic Disease (NIAMS) where, under the guidance of Ed Rall, he studied the effects of androgens on thyroid function, thyroxine metabolism, and thyroxine-binding protein. In 1957, he began a two-year clinical research fellowship with Sir Edward Pochin at the University College Hospital Medical School, London, pioneering in the use of radioactive iodine for the treatment of thyroid cancer. 

He returned to Harvard Medical School and Massachusetts General Hospital in 1964, serving as chief of endocrinology. He continued as assistant chief of medical services in 1967, associate professor of medicine in 1970, and associate chairman of medicine in 1971. In 1973, Dr. Federman was recruited to become physician-in-chief and chair of the Department of Medicine at Stanford University.

From 2000 to 2007, Federman was senior dean for alumni relations and clinical teaching at Harvard Medical School. After retiring in 2007, he taught at the University of Miami's Leonard M. Miller School of Medicine.

Personal life 
Federman met his wife Elizabeth (Betty) Buckley at Massachusetts General Hospital while a medical student.   They had two daughters, one of whom   graduated from Harvard Medical School while he served as Dean of Medical Education. 

He was an avid sailor and enjoyed classical music, having contributed to the work of the Longwood Symphony Orchestra in Boston, Massachusetts.

Honors
Harvard Medical School:
 Daniel D. Federman Staff Award for Exceptional Service to HMS/HSDM
 The White House Commission on Complementary and Alternative Medicine Policy
 Named Chair, Daniel D. Federman, MD Professor in Residence of Global Health and Social Medicine and Medical Education, currently held by Edward M. Hundert, MD, also current Dean for Medical Education at Harvard Medical School
  Chair of the Advisory Board, Scholars in Clinical Science Program, Harvard Medical School

Medical education: 
 President of the American College of Physicians
 Carl W. Walter Distinguished Professor of Medicine and Medical Education at Harvard Medical School
 Massachusetts Physician of the Year
 Distinguished Teacher Award of the American College of Physicians
 Endocrine Society Distinguished Educator Award
 Abraham Flexner Award for Distinguished Service to Medical Education, Association of American Medical Colleges (AAMC)
 David Rall Medal, Institute of Medicine
 Adjunct Professor at University of Miami's Miller School of Medicine for over six years as its Laurence Fishman visiting professor.

He authored at least 67 works in 207 publications in four languages and 7,370 library holdings and continued publishing in refereed journals until at least 2011.

See also 
 WorldCat list of most widely-read refereed publications authored by Daniel D. Federman, MD - indexed topically, and linking 'related identities'
 HMS Video Tribute to Dr. Daniel Federman (1928-2017) (7:29), also at https://vimeo.com/232825647, both produced in 2014
 HMS Print Tribute to Dr. Daniel Federman (1928-2017)
 Harvard Catalyst profile for Daniel David Federman, MD
 Symptoma index of topics of articles by Daniel D. Federman, MD, and co-authors
 Medical Communications profile for Daniel D. Federman, MD.  Brigham and Women's Hospital

References 

Harvard Medical School faculty
Medical educators
People from Boston
People from Brookline, Massachusetts
Harvard College alumni
Harvard Medical School alumni
Stanford University School of Medicine faculty
1928 births
2017 deaths
Scientists from the Bronx
Members of the National Academy of Medicine